AmeriSuites Hotels was a hotel chain last owned by Global Hyatt. It was founded by Mark Yale Harris, cofounder of Red Roof Inns. In 1991, Harris founded AmeriSuites Hotels. AmeriSuites was an innovator in offering one of the first available affordable suite accommodations. It grew to approximately 100 locations throughout the United States.

In 1998, AmeriSuites was sold to The Blackstone Group, who operated AmeriSuites under its Prime Hospitality division.

In 2005 Blackstone Real Estate Partners sold AmeriSuites to Hyatt. Between 2006 and 2009, Global Hyatt Select Hotel Group phased out the AmeriSuites brand and converted the properties into the then-new Hyatt Place brand.

References 

Hyatt Hotels and Resorts
Defunct hotel chains
Hotels established in 1991
Hotels disestablished in 2009
1991 establishments in the United States
1991 establishments in New Jersey